The Hello, I'm Dolly Tour in 2004 was Dolly Parton's first concert tour since 2002, her first major tour in a decade, and her largest tour in two decades.

History
After staging the very intimate, club-set Halos & Horns Tour in 2002, Parton returned with a venture on a much larger scale. The Hello, I'm Dolly Tour included new lighting, costumes, and included huge screens on the sides of the stage for each venue.  Parton said:
"The show itself has every color of me in it, from gospel to bluegrass to country to the bigger production numbers, and to the pop hits that I've been fortunate to do through the years. I think there will be something for everybody. I wanted to do it in a big way so all of us can enjoy it. My band and I are really looking forward to this!"

The tour was originally slated to promote Blue Smoke, which was to be Parton's new album that was scheduled to include a mix of new Parton material ("I Dreamed About Elvis", "Blue Smoke") as well as new covers of older songs ("Imagine", "Me and Bobby McGee").  The album was supposed to be released after the tour was over, presumably in the beginning of the 2005. Those plans were pushed back however because of Parton's involvement with writing the score to 9 to 5: The Musical .  It did eventually come to fruition, albeit becoming an album composed entirely of covers and was renamed Those Were The Days (2005).

"Blue Smoke" remains a fan favorite and was incredibly well received during these concerts. It was eventually released as the first single of her 2014 album Blue Smoke. "I Dreamed About Elvis" is a Parton-composed song that details the oft-told story that Elvis Presley wanted to record "I Will Always Love You"; those plans were never realized. It too was well received during these shows.

The show
All shows were in theatre-style seating with special large-screen video presentations, wall curtains, lighting and carpeting brought in for these specific concerts. The opening act (and six out of the ten members of Dolly's backing band for her concerts) were then-new bluegrass band The Grascals.

Parton wore three different costumes throughout the tour. All basically the same style, they were white, blue, and pink. Costume changes happened on stage, by Parton using "add-ons." She added a flowing skirt for the piano numbers, a hippie skirt for the covers, and a country-style-type skirt for the "Tennessee Mountain Home" segment. For the encore, she returned wearing a flowy, accordion-sleeve robe.

She played piano on stage for the first time on "The Grass Is Blue" (and later "Brand New Key").  She had recently recorded "Baby, It's Cold Outside" with Rod Stewart for his album Stardust: The Great American Songbook, Volume III. During the show, her longtime back-up singer, and former brother-in-law, Richard Dennison filled in for Stewart with Parton climbing up on the piano with a martini glass and cigarette as a lounge torch singer. During a segment on her prior duets with Kenny Rogers, Parton operated a Rogers ventriloquist's puppet against pre-recorded dialogue by Rogers and later while singing  (against pre-recorded vocals by Rogers) "Islands in the Stream".  The puppet was used at only a few of the shows during the East Coast portion of the show and the song subsequently dropped from the setlist.

Opening act
The Grascals

Set list
The following set list is representative of the October 14, 2004 show in Greenville, South Carolina . It is not representative of all concerts for the duration of the tour.
"Hello, I'm Dolly"
"Two Doors Down" 
"9 to 5"
"Jolene" / "Why'd You Come in Here Lookin' Like That" / "Here You Come Again"
"The Grass Is Blue"
"Baby, It's Cold Outside"
"I Dreamed About Elvis"
"Viva Las Vegas"
"PMS Blues"
"Blue Smoke"
"Go to Hell"
"Me and Bobby McGee"
"Imagine"
"Islands in the Stream"
"My Tennessee Mountain Home"
"Coat of Many Colors"
"Smoky Mountain Memories"
"Thank God I'm a Country Girl"
"Little Sparrow"
"I Will Always Love You"

Encore
 "Hello God"

Notes
"Brand New Key", "Burnin' Love", "Welcome Home", "When Johnny Comes Marching Home", "Shine", and "Rocky Top" were performed at some shows.

Tour dates

Box score office data

Crew
Monitor Engineer: Bryan Vasquez
System Tech: Bryan W. Baxley
FOH Engineer: Matt Naylor

External links
Parton's Official Website

Notes

References

 Dollymania
 Greenville Review
 San Jose Review
 State College Review

Dolly Parton concert tours
2004 concert tours